Las Canteras is a barrio (neighbourhood or district) of Montevideo, Uruguay.

Location
This barrio borders Malvín Norte to the west, Maroñas / Parque Guaraní to the northwest, Bañados de Carrasco to the north and northeast, Carrasco Norte to the east, Punta Gorda to the southeast and Malvín to the south.

Places of worship
 Church of Our Lady of Perpetual Help and St Eugene in the zone of La Cruz de Carrasco (Roman Catholic)

See also 
Barrios of Montevideo

Barrios of Montevideo